From the Vaults is a compilation album by the Scottish hard rock band Nazareth, released in 1993.

Track listing

1993 compilation albums
Nazareth (band) albums